This is a list of streets in San Francisco, California. They are grouped by type: arterial thoroughfares, commercial corridors, and other streets.

Arterial thoroughfares
 19th Avenue that bisects the western part of the city, extending from Interstate 280 to Golden Gate Park on the way to the Golden Gate Bridge. The section from Interstate 280 to Golden Gate Park is also designated as California State Route 1.
 California Street
 Fell Street runs from near the terminus of the Central Freeway towards Golden Gate Park, turning into Lincoln Way.
 Geary Boulevard splits into Geary Street and O'Farrell Street east of Gough Street.
 Fulton Street runs along the northern length of Golden Gate Park
 Lincoln Way runs along the southern length of Golden Gate Park
 Lombard Street acts as US 101 between Richardson and Van Ness Avenues
 Market Street
 Park Presidio Boulevard runs through the Richmond District between 14th Avenue and Funston Avenue connecting Golden Gate Park to the Presidio of San Francisco, and is itself a park. This route also carries California State Route 1.
 Portola Drive is the extension of Market Street into the south and western portion of San Francisco
 Van Ness Avenue acts as US 101 through the heart of San Francisco from the Central Freeway towards the northern section of the city and to the Golden Gate Bridge.

Commercial corridors
 24th Street: Between Church and Castro Street, it forms the principal commercial corridor of Noe Valley. Between Mission Street and Potrero Avenue, it forms a commercial corridor in the Mission District. There is a BART station at 24th and Mission Streets.
 Columbus Avenue runs diagonal to the prevailing grid pattern and forms the principal commercial corridor through North Beach
 Fillmore Street forms the principal commercial corridor of both Pacific Heights and the Fillmore
 Grant Avenue
 Kearny Street
 Mission Street
 Polk Street
 Stockton Street
 Union Street is the principal commercial corridor of Cow Hollow

Other streets
Third Street
22nd Street (San Francisco)
49-Mile Scenic Drive
Alemany Boulevard
Broadway
Castro Street
Cesar Chavez Street  (formerly Army Street)
Divisadero Street
Don Chee Way
The Embarcadero
Filbert Street
Golden Gate Avenue
Great Highway
Haight Street, namesake of the Haight-Ashbury district
Hayes Street
Junipero Serra Boulevard
John F. Kennedy Drive is the main East-West arterial for Golden Gate Park, beginning where it continues on from Fell Street running westward to the Great Highway.
Lombard Street, with 8 hairpin turns
Montgomery Street
New Montgomery Street
Octavia Boulevard
Skyline Boulevard
Vermont Street, with 7 hairpin turns – while the honor of "crookedest street in the world often goes to a block of Lombard Street, a section of this street is more sinuous
Howard Street (San Francisco)

Alleyways
Balmy Alley
Belden Place
Clarion Alley
Jack Kerouac Alley
Macondray Lane
Maiden Lane
 Ross Alley

See also 

 List of San Francisco placename etymologies

External links

References

 
San Francisco-related lists
San Francisco
San Francisco